Baptist Memorial Hospital-Memphis (formerly known as Baptist East) is a 706-bed a general hospital in Memphis, Tennessee. This hospital, built in 1979, is now the flagship of Baptist Memorial Health Care since the closure of the Madison Campus in the Medical District, Memphis in 2000, which dated from 1912. Baptist Memorial Health Care operates 22 Hospitals and numerous clinics in the three states surrounding the Memphis area. The former Madison Campus has been redeveloped by the University of Tennessee Health Science Center.

Facilities
The hospital has full emergency room services.

Baptist Memorial Health Care operates a University Baptist Health Sciences University centered on Health Professions nearby the site of the former Madison Campus. The school offers bachelor's degrees in Health care management, Nursing, Nuclear Medicine,   Radiation Therapy, Radiography, Respiratory Care, and Sonography.

See also
List of hospitals in Tennessee

References

External links

1979 establishments in Tennessee
Hospital buildings completed in 1979
Hospitals in Memphis, Tennessee